Mandvi is a town located in the Mandvi tehsil of Surat District, Gujarat state, India and lies on the banks of the Tapti River.

Mandvi is situated at an altitude of 50 meters and 113 km (aerial distance) from sea coast. The town is connected to surrounding towns by roads. There are three state highways passing through the city. The average annual rain fall for the area is 67 inches.

Mandvi an ancient town was once a State of King Bhil with its capital at Pipalwada. Mandvi was predominantly tribal area. After independence, Mandvi became an integral part of old Bombay State. When Bombay State was bifurcated, this area came under newly formed Gujarat. Mandvi is known for its carpentry, blacksmith work and handlooms. In Mandvi, residential land use predominates in the inner part of city. Commercial land use is broadly mixed type and it has mainly retail shops and groceries stores. The town can be divided in two parts. The left side can be considered developing and right side is less developed. On other part of the town area slum area, agriculture land, wasteland and a hilly area.

Premshankar Bhatt 

Premshankar Bhatt a prominent social worker, freedom fighter was the son of Mandvi who contributed in educating tribal kids of the southern tribal belt and started NGO in name of 'Dakshin Gujarat Adivasi Sevamandal'. Today his statue stands in the Mandvi Garden and you can see that while entering main town of Mandvi.

There are Two Prime schools, One is The Mandvi Highschool Mandvi and another is Shri V.F. Chaudhari Highschool Mandvi. There are several Colleges in Mandvi Town: Babubhai B. Avichal Arts and Commerce College, Mandvi, Priyadarshini College of Fine Arts, Mandvi, as well as recently opened BBA and MBA Colleges.
Mandvi is an Educational hub for near by villages. Priyadarshini College of fine Arts Mandvi is a unique Govt. of Gujarat 100% Grant in Aid college. In art line the no.1 college in Gujarat, many tribal children come for learn art and become professional artists.

Nearby Adivasi Ashrams 

Nearby Mandvi town there is a prominent Adivasi Ashramshalla run by Dakshin Gujarat Adivasi Sevamandal formed then by Shri Premshankar Bhattt a prominent freedom fighter, a fervent Gandhian, known as Gandhi of Dang due to his dedication to social work and honesty. His daughter Urmillaben Bhatt was known as white nun a mother Teresa of the region because of her selfless dedication in bringing education awareness in Adivasi tribal kids.

Nearby Markets and urban societies  

In Mandvi, there are two markets:  Navi market and Juni market. Furthermore, there are societies near a bus station:  Dahya park society and PN park society, which are the most desirable in Mandvi.

Politics in Mandvi 

Bharatiya Janata Party and Indian National Congress are the major political parties in this area.

Transportation 

By Air

There is no airport near to Mandvi. However Surat airport is major airport 56 km away.

By Train

There is no railway station near to Mandvi. However Surat Rail Way Station is major railway station 56 km near to Mandvi.

By Bus

There is bus station in Mandvi. Which is only way to connect surrounded local and national places.

Nearby tourist places  
 River front (Garden in front of Tapti River)
 Jetpur Kevdi (echo tourism center) – Kevdi is a well-stocked forest ecotourism site situated on the route connecting Jambughoda Sanctuary and Ratanmahal Sanctuary. It has a wonderful location as it is situated at the bank of a river. It comes under the Chhota Udaipur forest division. It is located 14 km from the Kanjeta Eco Campsite. The site is rich in biodiversity. Sloth bear, panther, hyena, and giant flying squirrel are often sighted at the site. The nearby tribal communities depend heavily on forests and forestry activities. It is developed as an eco-tourism site due to the feel that it provides of rich forests and biodiversity. The main attraction of the campsite is the flying squirrel which can be spotted in the evening and the sloth bears.
Facilities:
Orientation Centre
Tented accommodations only with separate bathing and toilet facilities
Separate kitchen and dining places
Amphitheatre
 Tapi garden 
 Dutt Mandir (known for secret story of queen)
 Rameshwar Mahadev Mandir (on the bank of Tapti River 4 km east from Mandvi)

References

See also 
List of tourist attractions in Surat

Suburban area of Surat
Cities and towns in Surat district
Ports and harbours of Gujarat